Tukan (Tuqan) is a rural locality (a selo) and the administrative centre of Tukansky Selsoviet, Beloretsky District, Bashkortostan, Russia. The population was 723 as of 2010. There are 33 streets.

Geography 
Tukan is located 81 km west of Beloretsk (the district's administrative centre) by road. Maygashlya is the nearest rural locality.

References 

Rural localities in Beloretsky District